Lamar Johnson is a Canadian actor and dancer. He is known for his roles as West in the dance drama The Next Step (2013–2019), as Seven Carter in the American drama film The Hate U Give (2018), and as Charlie in All the Bright Places (2020).

He received a Canadian Screen Award nomination for Best Lead Performance in a Film at the 11th Canadian Screen Awards in 2023, for his performance as Michael in the film Brother.

Personal life
Johnson was born in Toronto, Ontario. He is a skilled dancer and is self-taught, although he was later trained at the Canadian School of Dance. He attended school at St. Mother Teresa Catholic Academy. Johnson rose to fame in the hit show The Next Step as hip hop dancer West. He also danced with Seeds on the street, gaining experience dancing in a troupe. Before The Next Step, Johnson appeared in a movie called Honey.

Filmography

Film

Television

References

External links
 
 

Living people
Year of birth missing (living people)
Canadian male dancers
Canadian male film actors
Canadian male television actors
Canadian people of Barbadian descent
Male actors from Toronto
Black Canadian male actors
21st-century Canadian male actors